The Zagreb Glavni kolodvor–Dugo Selo railway, officially designated the M102 railway, is a  railway line in Croatia that connects the Croatian capital city Zagreb with the Dugo Selo. It is part of the Pan-European Corridor V, branch b, which runs from Rijeka to Budapest and the Pan-European Corridor X. The line is fully electrified and double-tracked. The M102 railway connects to several other railway lines within the Zagreb railway node linking the capital to other parts of Croatia and neighbouring countries. Besides Zagreb Glavni kolodvor (Zagreb main railway station) and Dugo Selo, the west and east termini of the railway, the line serves six other railway stations. One of them is Zagreb Borongaj, where the L203 railway connects as a branch line. The line is used for passenger (urban-suburban, regional and international) and freight traffic. 

In December of 2022, newly-built railway stop Sesvetska Sopnica was openned for passengers between the stop Čulinec and the station Sesvete. It is served by Zagreb's suburban (and some of regional) trains.

Reconstruction of the Zagreb Borongaj - Dugo Selo section (2013 - 2014) 
From 2013 to 2014, reconstruction of the railway corridor - upper and lower rail structure - and its electrification network was done between stations Zagreb Borongaj and Dugo Selo (excluding the stations Sesvete and Dugo Selo), which resulted in enabling of train operations at the maximum speed of 140 kilometers per hour on the open part of the track. Reconstruction also included installation of new canopies and replacement of existing passenger platforms with new ones at Trnava and Sesvetski Kraljevec stops as well as reconstruction of all at-grade railway crossings along the route

See also
List of railways in Croatia

Maps

References

External links

Railway lines in Croatia